Events in the year 1933 in Peru.

Incumbents
President: Luis Miguel Sánchez Cerro until April 30, Óscar R. Benavides
Prime Minister: 
 until 29 June: José Matías Manzanilla Barrientos
 29 June-24 November: Jorge Prado y Ugarteche 
 starting 24 November: José de la Riva-Agüero y Osma

Events
February 14 - unsuccessful attempt by Peruvian Air Force to bomb the Colombian Navy
April 30 - assassination of President Sánchez Cerro

Publications 
 María Wiesse: Nueve relatos (Nine stories).

Births
 February 10: Jaime Guardia, singer and charango player.

Deaths
April 30 - Luis Miguel Sánchez Cerro, President, assassination